Angela Makholwa is a South African author, the first black writer to write crime fiction in South Africa.

Life
Born in Johannesburg, Makholwa graduated in journalism from Rhodes University. She worked as a magazine journalist and public relations consultant for several agencies before establishing her own public relations firm, Britespark Communications, in 2002.  She came to the literary scene in 2007 with Red Ink, the first crime fiction by a black author in South Africa. In Red Ink the fictional detective, Lucy — a successful public relations writer — is drawn into investigating a horrifying series of rapes and murders:

Makholwa followed this up two years later with a chick-lit novel, The 30th Candle (2009). Her third novel was Black Widow Society (2013) and her latest novel The Blessed Girl was released in October 2017.

Works
 Red Ink, Pan Macmillan, 2007
 The 30th Candle, Pan Macmillan, 2009
 Black Widow Society, Pan Macmillan, 2013
 The Blessed Girl, Pan Macmillan, 2017

References

External links
 Talking authors: Angela Makholwa, Mail & Guardian, 25 November 2009

South African crime fiction writers
South African women writers
Crime fiction writers
Year of birth missing (living people)
Living people
Women crime writers
21st-century South African novelists